Dame Averil Millicent Cameron  ( Sutton; born 8 February 1940), often cited as A. M. Cameron, is a British historian. She was Professor of Late Antique and Byzantine History at the University of Oxford, and the Warden of Keble College, Oxford, between 1994 and 2010.

Early life
Cameron was born on 8 February 1940 in Leek, Staffordshire, the only child of working-class parents, Tom Roy Sutton and Millicent ( Drew) Sutton. She read literae humaniores at Somerville College, Oxford, where she was awarded the Edwards Scholarship in 1960 and the Rosa Hovey Scholarship in 1962.

From 1962 to 1980, she was married to Alan Cameron (1938–2017), a classical scholar. Together they had a son and a daughter.

Career
From 1965 to 1994, Cameron taught at King's College, London. She began as an assistant lecturer, before being promoted to lecturer in 1968 and to Reader in Ancient History in 1970. She was Professor of Ancient History from 1978 to 1989, and Professor of Late Antique and Byzantine Studies from 1989 to 1994. She was Founding Director of the Centre for Hellenic Studies, serving from 1989 to 1994. 

In 1994 she was elected Warden of Keble College, Oxford, where she served as Chair of the Conference of Colleges and as Pro-Vice-Chancellor, chair of committees relating to the Sackler Library, to the St Cross Building, to Honorary Degrees, Select Preachers, to the Bampton Lectures and to the Wainwright Fund, and was a member of the committee on conflict of interest.

Cameron was Editor of the Journal of Roman Studies from 1985 to 1990 and has served as Chair of a number of academic institutions, including the Oxford Centre for Byzantine Research and the Institute of Classical Studies Advisory Council, and chaired the project on the Prosopography of the Byzantine World at King's College London.

She was vice-chair and then chair of the Cathedrals Fabric Commission for England and chaired the Review of the Royal Peculiars (1999, Report published 2001).

Cameron has also acted as the President of academic societies including: the Ecclesiastical History Society (2005–2006), the Council for British Research in the Levant, and the International Federation of Associations of Classical Studies (2009–2014). 

In 2018, she became President of the Society for the Promotion of Byzantine Studies (2018–2023).

Work
Cameron's early articles explored early Byzantine and medieval writers including Agathias, Corippus, Procopius, and Gregory of Tours from literary and historical perspectives. Her early monographs, Agathias (1970) and Procopius and the Sixth Century (1985) were accompanied by a number of influential edited collections, including Images of Women in Antiquity, edited jointly with Amélie Kuhrt (1983), and History as Text (1989). With Christianity and the Rhetoric of Empire: The Development of Christian Discourse (1990), originating as the Sather Classical Lectures at Berkeley, Cameron sparked a scholarly conversation about "the power of discourse in society" in later antiquity, seeking to understand "how Christianity was able to develop a totalizing discourse'" (the phrase itself is borrowed from the work of Michel Foucault).

Along with Peter Brown, Cameron was a pioneer of the field of late antiquity, and her mature scholarship has included substantial surveys such as The Later Roman Empire, AD 284-430 (1993) and significant editorial commissions, including joint editorship of volumes 12, 13, and 14 of the Cambridge Ancient History (second edition). 

She wrote on late antiquity and the emergence of Islam, having been a co-founder of the series Studies on Late Antiquity and Early Islam, and recently published a number of influential studies opening up the subject of literary, philosophical and theological dialogues and debates in Byzantium from the early Christian period to the twelfth century, Dialoguing in Late Antiquity (2014), Arguing it Out (2016) and an edited volume with Niels Gaul (2017).

Her short book, Byzantine Matters (2014) and essays including 'The absence of Byzantium' (2008) have given rise to lively debate about the methodology of Byzantine studies.

Honours

Cameron holds honorary degrees from the Universities of Warwick, St Andrews, Aberdeen, Lund, London, and Queen's University Belfast, as well as a DLitt. from Oxford. 

She became a Commander of the Order of the British Empire (CBE) in 1999 and a Dame Commander (DBE) in 2006.

Cameron is a Fellow of the Society of Antiquaries of London, the British Academy, the Ecclesiastical History Society, the Institute of Classical Studies, London King's College, London, and the Royal Historical Society.

In 2007, a Festschrift edited by Hagit Amirav and Bas ter Haar Romeny, From Rome to Constantinople: Studies in Honour of Averil Cameron (Leuven: Peeters), was published in Cameron's honour.

In 2020, Cameron was awarded the British Academy Kenyon Medal for her lifetime contribution to Byzantine Studies. 

The medal was awarded for the first time in 1957. Cameron is the second woman to receive the award, after Joyce Reynolds (2017).

Selected bibliography

Books and edited volumes 
Agathias (Clarendon Press 1970), 
Images of Women in Antiquity, ed. with Amélie Kuhrt (London: Duckworth, 1983, rev. 1993),
Procopius and the Sixth Century (Duckworth 1985), 
History as Text, ed. (London: Duckworth, 1989)
The Greek Renaissance in the Roman Empire, ed. with Susan Walker (London: 1989)
Christianity and the Rhetoric of Empire: The Development of Christian Discourse (University of California Press 1991), 
The Byzantine and Early Islamic Near East I: Problems in the Literary Sources, ed. with Lawrence I. Conrad (Princeton: Darwin Press, 1992)
The Later Roman Empire, AD 284-430 (Fontana 1993), 
The Byzantine and Early Islamic Near East II: Land Use and Settlement Patterns, ed. with G.R.D. King (Princeton: Darwin Press, 1994)
The Byzantine and Early Islamic Near East III: States, Resources and Armies, ed. (Princeton: Darwin Press, 1995)
The Mediterranean World in Late Antiquity, AD 395-700 (London: Routledge 1993), ; rev/ and expanded ed. (London: Routledge, 2012)
Images of Women in Antiquity (rev. ed., Routledge 1993),  (ed. with Amélie Kuhrt)
Eusebius, Life of Constantine, trans. and commentary, with S.G. Hall (Oxford: Clarendon Press, 1999)
Fifty Years of Prosopography, ed., Publications of the British Academy (Oxford: Oxford University Press, 2003)
The Cambridge Ancient History
Vol. 12: The Crisis of Empire, AD 193-337 (Cambridge University Press 2005),  (2nd ed., ed. with Alan K. Bowman and Peter Garnsey)
Vol. 13: The Late Empire, AD 337-425 (Cambridge University Press 1998),  (ed. with Peter Garnsey)
Vol. 14: Late Antiquity: Empires and Successors, AD 425-600 (Cambridge University Press 2000),  (ed. with Bryan Ward-Perkins and Michael Whitby)
Doctrine and Debate in Eastern Christianity, 300-1500, ed. with Robert Hoyland (Farnham: Ashgate, 2011)
Late Antiquity on the Eve of Islam, The Formation of the Islamic World, ed. (Farnham: Ashgate, 2013)
The Byzantines (Oxford: Blackwell 2006), 
Dialoguing in Late Antiquity (Cambridge, MA:: Ashgate Harvard University Press, 2014)
Byzantine Matters (Princeton: Princeton University Press, 2014)
Arguing it Out: Discussion in Twelfth-Century Byzantium (Central European University Press, 2016)
Dialogues and Debates from Late Antiquity to Late Byzantium, ed. with Niels Gaul (Milton Park: Routledge, 2017)
Byzantine Christianity (London: SPCK, 2017).

Journal articles 
Recent articles include 'The Cost of Orthodoxy', Church History and Religious Culture, vol. 93 (2013) 339–61, and 'Early Christianity and the discourse of female desire', repr. from Women in Ancient Societies, ed. L. J. Archer, S. Fischler and M. Wyke (Basingstoke: Macmillan, 1994), 152–68, with an afterword, in The Religious History of the Roman Empire. Pagans, Jews and Christians, ed. J.A. North and S.R.F. Price (Oxford readings in Classical Studies, Oxford: Oxford University Press, 2011), 505–30, and 'Byzantium and the limits of Orthodoxy', Raleigh Lecture on History, (Proceedings of the British Academy 154 2008), 139–52.

References

1940 births
Living people
Academics of King's College London
Alumni of Somerville College, Oxford
Alumni of the University of Warwick
Dames Commander of the Order of the British Empire
English classical scholars
English historians
Fellows of Keble College, Oxford
Fellows of King's College London
Fellows of the British Academy
Pro-Vice-Chancellors of the University of Oxford
Religion academics
British Byzantinists
People from Leek, Staffordshire
Wardens of Keble College, Oxford
Classical scholars of the University of London
Classical scholars of the University of Oxford
Presidents of the Ecclesiastical History Society
British women historians
Historians of the University of Oxford
Women classical scholars
Corresponding Fellows of the Medieval Academy of America
Fellows of Somerville College, Oxford
Fellows of the Royal Historical Society
Scholars of Byzantine history
Presidents of The Roman Society
Contributors to the Oxford Classical Dictionary